Remnant church may refer to:
 Remnant (Seventh-day Adventist belief), the Seventh-day Adventist doctrine of the "remnant church"
 Remnant Church of Jesus Christ of Latter Day Saints
 Remnant Fellowship Church, the home church of Gwen Shamblin, author of The Weigh Down Diet, based in Franklin, Tennessee
See also HBO - The Way Down - God, Greed and the Cult of Gwen Shamblin. 
 "Remnant" movement

See also
 Remnant (disambiguation)
 Reorganized church